"Human Touch" is a song recorded by the American rock singer Bruce Springsteen. It was the first single from his 1992 album  of the same name and was released on March 9, 1992. The song features future American Idol judge Randy Jackson on bass guitar and Toto's Jeff Porcaro on drums. It is sometimes played by Springsteen and the E Street Band in concert despite their having been dismissed at the time of the original recording.

The song reached number one in Denmark, Italy, Norway, and Spain and was a top-10 hit in several other countries, including Canada, Ireland, the Netherlands, Sweden, and Switzerland. In the United States, the song reached number 16 on the Billboard Hot 100—charting as a double A-side with "Better Days"—and topped the Album Rock Tracks chart for three weeks. "Human Touch" was nominated for Best Rock Song at the 1993 Grammy Awards. The music video, directed by Meiert Avis, received an MTV Video Music Awards nomination for Best Male Video.

Track listings
CD maxi
 "Human Touch" – 6:28
 "Souls of the Departed" – 4:16
 "Long Goodbye" – 3:26

7-inch vinyl
 "Human Touch" – 6:28
 "Souls of the Departed" – 4:16

Personnel
According to authors Philippe Margotin and Jean-Michel Guesdon:

 Bruce Springsteen – vocals, guitar
 Randy Jackson – bass
 Jeff Porcaro – drums, tambourine
 Roy Bittan – keyboards
 Patti Scialfa – backing vocals

Charts

Weekly charts

Year-end charts

Certifications

|}

See also
 List of number-one hits in Norway
 List of number-one mainstream rock hits (United States)

References

1992 singles
1992 songs
Bruce Springsteen songs
Columbia Records singles
Music videos directed by Meiert Avis
Number-one singles in Denmark
Number-one singles in Italy
Number-one singles in Norway
Number-one singles in Spain
Song recordings produced by Bruce Springsteen
Song recordings produced by Chuck Plotkin
Song recordings produced by Jon Landau
Songs written by Bruce Springsteen